Vladislav Chernushenko (born January 14, 1936) is a Soviet/Russian conductor, People's Artist of the USSR and State Prize laureate. He was educated at the Choir School of the State Cappella where his teacher was Pallady Bogdanov and later moved to Leningrad Conservatory where he was under guidance from Ilya Musin, Yevgeny Mravinsky, and Nikolay Rabinovich. In 1974 he became principal conductor of the Saint Petersburg State Academic Capella. From 1979 to 2002 he was rector of the Conservatory in Leningrad/St.Petersburg.

References

1936 births
People's Artists of the USSR
State Prize of the Russian Federation laureates
Living people
21st-century Russian conductors (music)
Russian male conductors (music)
21st-century Russian male musicians